Maurice Laine (10 May 1895 – 2 October 1962) was a French racing cyclist. He rode in the 1923 Tour de France.

References

1895 births
1962 deaths
French male cyclists
Place of birth missing